is a game for the WonderSwan developed by Capcom, published by Bandai in 1999 and is the fourth game in the mainline series of the Ghosts 'n Goblins franchise.

Gameplay
Sharing similar gameplay to its predecessors, Makaimura also shares enemies, weapons and backgrounds from the previous three games. Unique features include diverging paths between the second and fifth levels, swimming in water, and a level which requires the player to rotate the WonderSwan by 90 degrees as Arthur climbs and swings down a rope in a vertical shaft. It is a common misconception that the game can be completed without completing the second loop. This is false, however.

References

1999 video games
Bandai games
Dark fantasy video games
Video games about ghosts
Ghosts 'n Goblins
Japan-exclusive video games
Platform games
Run and gun games
Video games developed in Japan
WonderSwan games
Video games about zombies